Ampelia is a village of the Elassona municipality. Before the 2011 local government reform it was a part of the community of Verdikoussa. The 2011 census recorded 256 inhabitants in the village.

Population
According to the 2011 census, the population of the settlement of Ampelia was 256 people, an increase of almost 17% compared with the population of the previous census of 2001.

See also
 List of settlements in the Larissa regional unit

References

Populated places in Larissa (regional unit)